Bay 21 is a two condominium buildings comprising the Bay 21 Condominium and Bay Suites located near the Likas Bay in Kota Kinabalu. The first building which is Bay 21 condominium consists of 30-storey while Bay Suites consists of 35-storey which is also the 3rd tallest building in Borneo Island. Bay 21 is designed by architect Lo Su Yin.

References 

Buildings and structures in Kota Kinabalu
Condominiums in Malaysia